K10 may refer to:

Aircraft 
 Kalinin K-10, a Soviet trainer
 Kawanishi K-10 Transport, a Japanese biplane
 Schleicher K 10, a German glider
 Skyeton K-10 Swift, a Ukrainian light-sport aircraft

Automobiles 
 K10 ARV, a South Korean ammunition resupply vehicle
 Kandi K10, a Chinese city car
 Maruti Alto K10, a Japanese city car
 Nissan Micra (K10), a Japanese hatchback

Ships 
 , a Penguin-class submarine rescue ship of the Brazilian Navy
 , a K-class submarine of the Royal Navy
 , a Flower-class corvette of the Royal Navy
 , a Loch-class frigate of the South African Navy

Other 
 K-10 (Kansas highway)
 K-10 robot, a rover used to explore planetary surfaces
 K10 transport/localisation element (TLS), a cis-regulatory RNA element
 AMD K10, an AMD x86 CPU architecture
 K-10S, a Soviet supersonic anti-ship missile
 Keratin 10, a human protein
 LG K10, a smartphone
 LSWR K10 class, a British steam locomotive
 Sonata in B flat, K. 10, by Wolfgang Amadeus Mozart